Govan Shipbuilders Ltd (GSL) was a British shipbuilding company based on the River Clyde at Glasgow in Scotland. It operated the former Fairfield Shipyard and took its name from the Govan area in which it was located.

History

The company was formed in 1972 by way of a purchase of the former Fairfield Shipyard in Govan from Sir Robert Smith, Liquidator of Upper Clyde Shipbuilders (UCS), itself a product of the amalgamation of several Clydeside yards; Fairfields, Alex Stephens, Charles Connell and Company, Yarrow Shipbuilders Ltd. and John Browns.

Between 1973 and 1980 Scotstoun Marine Ltd, a subsidiary of Govan Shipbuilders, also operated the former Connell shipyard in Scotstoun.

In 1977 the Company was nationalised by the Labour government of James Callaghan under the Aircraft and Shipbuilding Industries Act and subsumed into British Shipbuilders.

Between 1973 and 1988, a total of 53 ships were built by Govan Shipbuilders at the Govan (former Fairfield) shipyard. Investment in plant equipment at the yard during this period included expansion of the steel fabrication facilities and the installation of four 80 ton travelling rope luffing cranes in 1975 by Clarke Chapman, servicing the yard's three slipways, in order to increase the size of units that could be prefabricated. An additional three 80 ton cranes from Scotstoun Marine Ltd were dismantled and transferred to Govan after the Scotstoun yard closed in 1980; they remain distinctive due to their blue paintwork.

In 1988 the Govan Shipbuilders was sold to the Norwegian group Kvaerner Industries and was renamed Kvaerner Govan.

References

External links
   The Clyde-built ships data base - lists over 22,000 ships built on the Clyde
 Faifield Shipyard, Govan - Clyde Waterfront Heritage

History of Glasgow
Defunct shipbuilding companies of Scotland
Manufacturing companies based in Glasgow
Defunct companies of Scotland
Former defence companies of the United Kingdom
Govan
Vehicle manufacturing companies established in 1972
British companies established in 1972
1972 establishments in Scotland
Vehicle manufacturing companies disestablished in 1988
British companies disestablished in 1988
1988 disestablishments in Scotland
British Shipbuilders